Martin Walkyier (born 20 September 1967) is an English singer, known for his participation in the heavy metal bands Sabbat and Skyclad.  The late Metal Hammer journalist Detlef Dengler called Walkyier a "great lyricist" known for his multitude of words and "brilliant puns". Author Paul Stenning has referred to Walkyier as a "lyrical genius".

Biography 
Martin Walkyier was born on 20 November 1967 as the only child of Roy and Eve Walkyier. At the age of eight, he began to become interested in acting and poetry and started to play guitar. Fascinated by bands like Witchfynde, he formed Hydra and later Sabbat with Fraser Craske.

Walkyier quit his job as a truck driver to invest more time in his music although he would have no secure income. He left Sabbat in 1990 and returned to the music scene with Skyclad — a band that mixed heavy metal with folk music and pioneered folk metal.

After the release of ten albums, Walkyier was broke. He later said that: "The insight that you can't live on dreaming came too late. Unfair contracts, incompetent advisers, wrong decisions, and my naivety almost broke my neck. I ended up feeling like in a marriage, not divorced because of the children."

Walkyier left Skyclad and started working as a nightwatchman for a furniture store. He gave occasional concerts under the name Return to the Sabbat, and started the company Prick Tees, which designed and produced T-shirts.

Walkyier helped out bassist Iscariah when he  moved to England with his family. Walkyier secured an apartment for him and a job for his wife. It took two years to organise everything before they could seriously work on Walkyier's new band: The Clan Destined.

Walkyier had to help his frail mother and his ill father while The Clan Destined faded into the background. According to Walkyier, Iscariah left without telling him why and abandoned him. However, he finished In the Big Ending, but was disillusioned and announced it would be his last musical work. However, he promised his father on his deathbed that he would continue. (Roy Walkyier died in early 2007).

Martin Walkyier structured and arranged the music previously composed by Iscariah. The resulting album featured a DVD with a video to the song "A Beautiful Start to the End of the World," inspired by the novel Aimée und Jaguar. According to Metal Hammer journalist Detlef Dengler, the video "is professional and looks very expensive"; however, according to Walkyier "it cost almost nothing." He continued: "The Clan Destined consist of Pagans with a common life philosophy as artists, designers and film-makers.

Sabbat reformed in 2006 to play a series of well-received shows.

In late 2008, Walkyier finished the recordings for The Clan Destined's debut album and recorded vocals for Hell's debut album. "Hell and especially their singer Dave Halliday were my idols in the early 1980s. My friends all listened to Metallica, but I felt attracted to bands with image and true personality. The theatrics of bands like Hell influenced me tremendously."

With Walkyier's friend Andy Sneap also "a fanatic Hell supporter", they approached the remaining three members after Halliday's suicide and offered to help them out as singer and guitarist and to give the old songs a modern production.

Walkyier also contributed guest vocals for Cradle of Filth and Forgodsake.

In 2008 and 2009, Walkyier announced he was working on a rock opera. The story, entitled: Plugging Hellfire, was published in Devolution magazine. It was illustrated by Neil Sims, with a biography contributed by Paul Stenning.

In October 2009, Walkyier announced that he was working on writing and recording some brand-new material for The Clan Destined.

Discography

With Sabbat 
Blood for the Blood God EP, 1987
Stranger Than Fiction Demo, 1987
A Cautionary Tale/And the Brave Man Fails Split, 1988
History of a Time to Come Full-length, 1988
Dreamweaver Full-length, 1989
Wildfire/The Best of Enemies Single, 1989

With Skyclad 
 The Wayward Sons of Mother Earth Full-Length 1991
 A Burnt Offering for the Bone Idol Full-Length 1992
 Tracks from the Wilderness EP 1992
 Jonah's Ark Full-Length 1993
 Thinking Allowed? Single 1993
 Prince of the Poverty Line Full-Length 1994
 The Silent Whales of Lunar Sea Full-Length 1995
 Irrational Anthems Full-Length 1996
 Oui Avant-Garde á Chance Full-Length 1996
 The Answer Machine? Full-Length 1997
 Outrageous Fourtunes Limited Edition EP 1998
 Vintage Whine Full-Length 1999
 Classix Shape Limited Edition EP 1999
 Folkémon Full-Length 2000
 Another Fine Mess Live Album 2001

With The Clan Destined 
 In the Big Ending Demo 2006

Guest appearances 
During Walkyier's career, he has made several guest vocal appearances such as:

 A verse in the Forgodsake song "Skyhigh" from the Blasthead album (1994)
 Guest vocals on Cradle of Filth's cover of the Sabbat track "For Those Who Died" on Midian (2000) and on the song "The Snake-Eyed and the Venomous" from the deluxe edition of Thornography (2006)
 Guest Vocals on Torsohorse song "Face To Face" from 2006 album No Going Back
 Guest vocals on Skiltron's cover of the Running Wild track "Ballad of William Kidd" from the ReUnation – A Tribute to Running Wild album (2009)
 Verse on "Female Drugthing" on Pyogenesis' Love Nation Sugarhead EP, Nuclear Blast 1997
 Guest vocals on Nepal's song "Besando la Tierra (segunda versión)" from 1997 album "Manifiesto"
 Guest vocals on Tuatha de Danann's "Rhymes Against Humanity" from their 2015 album Dawn of a New Sun and on the song "Your Wall Shall Fall" from their 2019 EP "The Tribes of Witching Souls".

References

External links 
 The Clan Destined homepage

English heavy metal singers
English male singers
Living people
1967 births